Pierre Léna, born on 22 November 1937 in Paris, is a French astrophysicist. He is a member of the French Academy of Sciences.

Winner of Fernand Holweck Medal and Prize in 1995.

References

Living people
French astrophysicists
Scientists from Paris
1937 births